Camilla Nordberg Thorsen (born 30 December 1975) is a Norwegian team handball player who played for the Norwegian clubs IL Bergkameratene, Gjerpen, Tertnes and Nordnes, the German club HC Leipzig, and the Danish clubs Viborg HK and Ikast-Bording. She retired from top handball in 2008.

Thorsen became European champion with the Norwegian national team in 2004.  She also played at the 2005 World Women's Handball Championship, where the team finished 9th.

References

External links 
 

1975 births
Living people
Norwegian female handball players
Expatriate handball players
Viborg HK players